Ripogonum fawcettianum, commonly known as small supplejack, is a small climbing vine, or sometimes a shrub, native to coastal rainforests of New South Wales and Queensland, Australia.

References

fawcettianum
Flora of Queensland
Flora of New South Wales
Taxa named by Ferdinand von Mueller
Taxa named by George Bentham